may refer to:

 Niigata Prefecture, Japan
Niigata (city), the capital of the prefecture
 Albirex Niigata, the city's professional football club
 Niigata Transys, a Japanese railway vehicle manufacturer
 Niigata Stadium, now Denka Big Swan Stadium, an athletic stadium in Niigata, Japan.